Robert Aymar was the Director General of CERN (2004–2008), serving a five-year term in that role.

Aymar was born in 1936 in France. After studying at the École Polytechnique, Robert Aymar entered the Corps des Poudres (a former government agency involved in basic and applied research). Following his secondment to the Commissariat à l'énergie atomique (CEA) in 1959, his career has been focused on fundamental research in plasma physics and its application in controlled thermonuclear fusion research.

In 1977, Robert Aymar was appointed Head of the Tore Supra Project, to be constructed at Cadarache (France). In 1990, he was appointed Director of the Direction des Sciences de la Matière of the CEA, where he directed a wide range of basic research programmes, both experimental and theoretical.

Robert Aymar has served on many Councils and Committees at national and international level, for example, the Institut Laue Langevin (ILL), the European Synchrotron Research Facility (ESRF), and the Joint European Torus (JET). He also acted as chairman of the European Fusion Technology Steering Committee, and as a member of the ITER (International Thermonuclear Experimental Reactor) Technical Advisory Committee. He was appointed ITER Director in 1994 and International Team Leader in 2001.

He chaired the international scientific committee that assessed CERN's Large Hadron Collider (LHC) and recommended it for approval in 1996. He also chaired the External Review Committee that was set up by the CERN Council in December 2001 to review the CERN programme. 

He succeeded Luciano Maiani as Director-General of CERN in January 2004. He was honoured in 2006 with the International Global Energy Prize, in 2011 with the National Order of the Legion of Honour of the French Republic.

References

People associated with CERN
French physicists
Living people
1936 births